Butterfield is a side platformed Sacramento RT light rail station in La Riviera, California, United States. The station was opened on September 5, 1987, and is operated by the Sacramento Regional Transit District. It is served by the Gold Line. The station is located at the intersection of Folsom Boulevard and Butterfield Way just northeast of Highway 50. From its opening through the opening of the Mather Field/Mills station September 6, 1998, this served as the eastern terminus of the original RT light rail alignment (the Watt/I-80–Downtown–Butterfield line).

Platforms and tracks

External links
Station profile

References

Sacramento Regional Transit light rail stations
Railway stations in the United States opened in 1987